Carl André (27 July 1878 – 6 July 1923) was a cricketer from Cape Colony. He played in two first-class matches for Border in 1903/04 and 1906/07.

See also
 List of Border representative cricketers

References

External links
 

1878 births
1923 deaths
Cricketers from Cape Colony
Border cricketers
Sportspeople from Qonce